Club Nacional de Football's 2010–11 season is the club's 111th year of existence and the club's 107th in the top-flight.

Club

Personnel
Chairman: Ricardo Alarcón
Sports Manager: Daniel Henríquez
Coaching staff
Manager: Juan Ramón Carrasco
Assistant manager: Darwin Rodríguez
Goalkeeper coach: Omar Garate
Fitness coach: Mauricio Marchetti
Doctor: Carlos Suero
First team collaborate: Ruben Sosa

Kits
Provider: Umbro
Sponsors: Antel, Macri Sport Center

Squad
As of June 3, 2011

Winter transfers

Summer transfers

Competitions

Friendlies

Porongos' 100 years celebration

Copa Fontera de la Paz

Copa Carlos Gardel

Copa Bimbo

Copa Antel Bicentenario

Noche Alba

Primera División

Torneo Apertura

Matches

Torneo Clausura

Matches

Aggregate table

Relegation

Championship playoff

Copa Libertadores

Player statistics

Last updated on June 12, 2011.Note: Players in italics left the club mid-season.

See also
2010–11 in Uruguayan football

References

External links
 Club Nacional de Football official web site 

Club Nacional de Football seasons